Really Love is a 2020 American romantic drama film directed by Angel Kristi Williams and co-written with Felicia Pride. The film is set in Washington, D.C. and centers the romance between a struggling artist (Kofi Siriboe) and an ambitious law student (Yootha Wong-Loi-Sing). Really Love debuted in October 2020 at AFI Film Festival. It received mainly positive critical reception and holds an 86% rating on Rotten Tomatoes.

Plot
"Set in a gentrifying Washington, D.C., a rising Black painter tries to break into a competitive art world, while balancing a whirlwind romance he never expected."

Cast
 Kofi Siriboe as Isaiah Maxwell, a struggling artist
 Yootha Wong-Loi-Sing as Stevie Richmond, an ambitious law student
 Blair Underwood as Jerome Richmond, Stevie's Father
 Uzo Aduba as Chenai Hungwe
 Mack Wilds as Nick Wright, Isaiah's friend since childhood
 Naturi Naughton as Sicily Richmond, Stevie's cousin
 Suzzanne Douglas as Anne Richmond, Stevie's mother
 Michael Ealy as Yusef Davis, Isaiah's colleague
 Jade Eshete as Mecca Gerima
 GoldLink as himself

Production 
Really Love is director Angel Kristi Williams' feature film debut and Felicia Pride's debut screenplay. The two met through a mutual friend, after which Pride showed Williams the Really Love screenplay and invited her to direct the project.

Williams stated that she was inspired by films including In the Mood For Love, Blue Valentine, and Love Jones. The production designer was Nathan Parker and the cinematographer was Shawn Peters. It was produced and financed by Homegrown Pictures and Charles D. King's production company MACRO. The artwork done by Isaiah in the film was created by artists Gerald Lovell, Chanel Compton, and Ronald Jackson.

On July 8, 2018 it was announced that Kofi Siriboe was cast in a lead role in the film. Uzo Aduba, Naturi Naughton, Tristan Wilds, Yootha Wong-Loi-Sing, and Jade Eshete were announced as cast members on July 26, 2018. Michael Ealy was announced on July 31, 2018. The film is one of the last projects completed by Suzzanne Douglas prior to her death in 2021.

The film was shot beginning in July 2018 on-location in Washington, D.C., as well as in Baltimore, Williams' hometown. Shooting locations included the Baltimore Museum of Art, the Baltimore School for the Arts, the Parkway Theatre, Dovecote Cafe, and Williams' grandmother's home in Park Heights.

Release 
The film was originally set to premiere at South by Southwest in March 2020. However, after the festival was cancelled due to the COVID-19 pandemic, it debuted at AFI's virtual film festival in October 2020.

Soundtrack 
The official soundtrack with an original jazz score composed by Khari Mateen was released on September 17, 2021. Screenwriter Felicia Pride said the soundtrack's ambiance was influenced by tracks like "Sumthin Sumthin (Mellosmoothe)" by Maxwell from the film Love Jones. Ari Lennox, Kamasi Washington, Christian Scott aTunde Adjuah, and others appear in Really Love.

Really Love began streaming on Netflix on August 25, 2021.

Reception 
On the review aggregator website Rotten Tomatoes, 86% of 7 critics' reviews are positive, with an average rating of 6.8/10.

In a review for Film Threat, Alex Saveliev compared the film to If Beale Street Could Talk and praised it as a "gentle, poignant examination of two young people at the dawn of self-discovery".
  In a similarly positive review, Robert Daniels wrote for The Playlist, "“Really Love” is a timeless black romance. Kristi Williams is an assured new voice already nestling herself inside audiences’ hearts."

Loi-Sing and Siriboe received a Special Jury Recognition for Acting at South by Southwest.

References

External links 
 
 

2020 drama films
American independent films
African-American romantic drama films
Films set in Washington, D.C.
2020 romantic drama films
2020 independent films
2020s English-language films
2020s American films